Alan Thomas Lawrence Wilson (born 27 March 1955) is a British Anglican bishop. Since October 2003, he has been the area Bishop of Buckingham in the Diocese of Oxford.

Early life and education
Wilson was born on 27 March 1955 in Redford Barracks in Edinburgh, Scotland. He was educated at Sevenoaks School, then an all-boys private school in Kent. He studied history at St John's College, Cambridge, graduating with a Bachelor of Arts (BA) degree in 1977; as per tradition, this was promoted to a Master of Arts (MA Cantab) degree in 1981. From 1977 to 1979, he trained for ordained ministry at Wycliffe Hall, Oxford.

Ordained ministry
Wilson was made a deacon at Petertide (1 July) 1979 by Eric Wild, Bishop of Reading, at St Peter's, Didcot, and ordained a priest the Petertide following (29 June 1980) by Patrick Rodger, Bishop of Oxford, at Christ Church Cathedral, Oxford. From 1979 to 1981 he was an honorary assistant curate of Eynsham (where he met his future wife) and also held an academic position funded by the University of Oxford. From 1981 to 1982, he was an assistant curate in the same parish, his academic position having ended.

His Doctor of Philosophy (DPhil) degree, for which he studied as a student of Balliol College, Oxford, was awarded in 1989. He had completed his thesis in 1988. The official title of his thesis is "The theology of church and party of some London ritualistic clergy and parishes, 1880–1914, with special reference to the Church Crisis of 1898-1906", although it bears the unofficial title "The authority of church and party among London Anglo-Catholics, 1880–1914, with special reference to the Church Crisis, 1898–1904".

Wilson spent the following years of his ministry in a variety of positions, including as a prison chaplain. He was vicar of St Michaels, Sandhurst, Rural Dean of Sonning and an honorary canon at Christ Church Cathedral, Oxford.

Episcopal ministry
On 9 October 2003, Wilson was consecrated a bishop by Rowan Williams, Archbishop of Canterbury, at Westminster Abbey. He then became Bishop of Buckingham, an area bishop in the Diocese of Oxford.

On 11 February 2017, fourteen retired bishops signed an open letter to the then-serving bishops of the Church of England. In an unprecedented move, they expressed their opposition to the House of Bishops' report to General Synod on sexuality, which recommended no change to the church's canons or practises around sexuality. By 13 February, Wilson (the only serving bishop) and nine further retired bishops had added their signatures; on 15 February, the report was rejected by synod.

Personal life
Wilson has been married since 1984 and they have five children.

Selected works

Styles
The Reverend Alan Wilson (1979–1989)
The Reverend Doctor Alan Wilson (1989–2002)
The Reverend Canon Doctor Alan Wilson (2002–2003)
The Right Reverend Doctor Alan Wilson (2003–present)

References

External links 
 Full text of doctoral thesis via Oxford Research Archive

1955 births
Living people
Clergy from Edinburgh
People educated at Sevenoaks School
Alumni of Balliol College, Oxford
Alumni of Wycliffe Hall, Oxford
Alumni of St John's College, Cambridge
20th-century Scottish Episcopalian priests
Anglican chaplains
British chaplains
Bishops of Buckingham
Prison chaplains
20th-century Anglican theologians
21st-century Anglican theologians